Jean Bretonnière (1924–2001) was a French actor and singer. He was married to the actress Geneviève Kervine.

Selected filmography
 Under the Sky of Paris (1951)
 The Green Glove (1952)
 It Happened in Aden (1954)
 Naughty Girl (1956)
 The Judge and the Assassin (1976)

References

Bibliography 
 Goble, Alan. The Complete Index to Literary Sources in Film. Walter de Gruyter, 1999.

External links 
 

1924 births
2001 deaths
French male stage actors
French male film actors
Musicians from Tours, France
20th-century French male singers
Actors from Tours, France